Rin may refer to:
,  yen, former Japanese currency
Rin (given name)
Rin (detergent), a brand of detergent sold by Unilever
Rin, a Japanese standing bell
Mnemosyne (anime) or RIN: Daughters of Mnemosyne, an anime
Rin! (凛!), a Japanese manga comic
Rin', a Japanese pop group active from 2003 to 2009
rin(), one representation of the functional square root of sin()
Rin (album) (凛, "Dignified") 2017
Rin, an English language name for the 1986 Japanese television series Hanekonma

See also
RIN (disambiguation)
Rinn (disambiguation)
Rinne (disambiguation)